Tymbarcha translucida is a species of moth of the genus Tymbarcha and the family Tortricidae. It is found in Western Indonesia (Java).

References

Moths described in 1941
Tortricini
Moths of Indonesia